"Bedtime Story" is a song written by Billy Sherrill and Glenn Sutton, and recorded by American country music artist Tammy Wynette.  It was released in November 1971 as the first single and title track from the album Bedtime Story.  The song was Wynette's eleventh number one on the country charts spending one week at the top and a total of thirteen weeks on the country charts.

Charts

Weekly charts

Year-end charts

References

1971 singles
Tammy Wynette songs
Songs written by Billy Sherrill
Songs written by Glenn Sutton
Song recordings produced by Billy Sherrill
Epic Records singles
1971 songs